Anouck Jaubert (born 27 January 1994) is a French sport climber competing in speed climbing competitions.

In 2017, she won the silver medal in the women's speed event at the World Games held in Wrocław, Poland. Four years earlier, she competed in the women's speed event at the 2013 World Games where she was eliminated in the quarter-finals by Yulia Kaplina of Russia.

She represented France at the 2020 Summer Olympics in Tokyo, Japan. She competed in the women's combined event.

References

External links
 

Living people
1994 births
Female climbers
World Games silver medalists
Competitors at the 2013 World Games
Competitors at the 2017 World Games
Sport climbers at the 2020 Summer Olympics
Olympic sport climbers of France
IFSC Climbing World Championships medalists
IFSC Climbing World Cup overall medalists
Speed climbers
21st-century French women